Makhach Ibragimovich Kerimov (born 10 March 1955 — dead 01.05.2021) is a Russian football coach and a former player.

External links
 

1955 births
Living people
Soviet footballers
Russian football managers
FC Anzhi Makhachkala managers
Association football defenders
FC Dynamo Makhachkala players